Abu Haef Kigab (born November 3, 1998) is a Sudanese-Canadian professional basketball player who is currently a free agent. He played college basketball for the Oregon Ducks and for the Boise State Broncos of the Mountain West Conference.

High school career
Born in Khartoum, Sudan, Kigab moved to St. Catharines, Ontario with his family at age nine. He attended Queen Mary Public School and St. Francis Catholic Secondary School and joined the Prolific Prep Academy in Napa, California in 2015.

Kigab was tabbed a breakout performer at Basketball Without Borders in 2016 and was ranked a four-star recruit in the class of 2017 by Scout and ESPN.

He committed to playing college basketball for Oregon in March 2017, having also considered Illinois, Baylor, California, Kansas, Minnesota, USC and Virginia Tech.

College career
As a sophomore, Kigab averaged 2.6 points and 2.7 rebounds per game in 10 games. On January 14, 2019, it was announced that he was transferring to Boise State. Kigab averaged 11.1 points and 3.6 rebounds per game as a junior. As a senior, he averaged 11.8 points, 5.4 rebounds, two assists, 1.2 steals and 0.9 blocks per game, earning Second Team All-Mountain West Conference honors. In the final game of the season, Kigab suffered a torn labrum in his right shoulder. He opted to take advantage of the fifth season of eligibility granted by the NCAA due to the COVID-19 pandemic. Kigab was named to the Second Team All-Mountain West for the second consecutive season.

Professional career

Fort Wayne Mad Ants (2022)
On October 24, 2022, Kigab joined the Fort Wayne Mad Ants training camp roster. However, he did not make the final roster.

National team career
Kigab competed for Canada at the 2015 FIBA U19 World Cup and the 2016 FIBA Americas U18 Championship. In July 2017, he was a key player on a Canada team that captured gold at the FIBA U19 World Cup, averaging 14.7 points and 10.6 rebounds, as well as 2.3 assists per game. For his efforts, he was named to the tournament's All-Star Five.

Career statistics

College

|-
| style="text-align:left;"| 2017–18
| style="text-align:left;"| Oregon
| 35 || 0 || 7.7 || .344 || .227 || .409 || 1.1 || .2 || .4 || .2 || 1.6
|-
| style="text-align:left;"| 2018–19
| style="text-align:left;"| Oregon
| 10 || 3 || 14.9 || .440 || .091 || .600 || 2.7 || 1.8 || .2 || .0 || 2.6
|-
| style="text-align:left;"| 2019–20
| style="text-align:left;"| Boise State
| 20 || 18 || 25.8 || .420 || .328 || .734 || 3.6 || 1.0 || .7 || .3 || 11.1
|-
| style="text-align:left;"| 2020–21
| style="text-align:left;"| Boise State
| 25 || 25 || 28.0 || .467 || .301 || .716 || 5.4 || 2.0 || 1.2 || .9 || 11.8
|-
| style="text-align:left;"| 2021–22
| style="text-align:left;"| Boise State
| 35 || 35 || 31.5 || .500 || .301 || .677 || 5.7 || 2.4 || 1.3 || .4 || 14.8
|- class="sortbottom"
| style="text-align:center;" colspan="2"| Career
| 125 || 81 || 121.9 || .461 || .293 || .680 || 3.8 || 1.4 || .8 || .4 || 8.9

References

External links
Boise State Broncos bio
Oregon Ducks bio

1998 births
Living people
Basketball people from Ontario
Black Canadian basketball players
Boise State Broncos men's basketball players
Canadian expatriate basketball people in the United States
Canadian men's basketball players
Oregon Ducks men's basketball players
People from Khartoum
Small forwards
Sportspeople from St. Catharines
Sudanese emigrants to Canada